Manchester South West was one of six single-member Parliamentary constituencies created in 1885 by the division of the existing three-member Parliamentary Borough of Manchester.  It was abolished in 1918.

Boundaries 
The constituency, which was created by the Redistribution of Seats Act 1885, consisted of the civil parish of Hulme.

Members of Parliament

Elections

Elections in the 1880s

Elections in the 1890s

Elections in the 1900s

Elections in the 1910s

General Election 1914–15:

Another General Election was required to take place before the end of 1915. The political parties had been making preparations for an election to take place and by the July 1914, the following candidates had been selected; 
Liberal: Christopher Needham
Unionist:

References 

South West
Constituencies of the Parliament of the United Kingdom established in 1885
Constituencies of the Parliament of the United Kingdom disestablished in 1918